Church of Saint Nicholas (of Benedictine Sisters) is a Roman Catholic church in the Old Town of Kaunas, Lithuania.

Gallery

References

15th-century Roman Catholic church buildings in Lithuania
Roman Catholic churches in Kaunas
Brick Gothic
Gothic architecture in Lithuania